Autographa californica, the alfalfa looper, is a moth of the family Noctuidae. The species was first described by Adolph Speyer in 1875. It is found in western North America from southern British Columbia to Baja California and to Manitoba, South Dakota, Colorado and New Mexico.

The wingspan is 36–42 mm. The moth flies from July to October depending on the location.

The larvae feed on a wide range of plants. Recorded food plants include species of families Apiaceae, Aquifoliaceae, Asteraceae, Boraginaceae, Brassicaceae, Caprifoliaceae, Chenopodiaceae, Cucurbitaceae, Ericaceae, Fabaceae, Grossulariaceae, Liliaceae, Lamiaceae, Linaceae, Malvaceae, Plantaginaceae, Poaceae, Podocarpaceae, Polygonaceae, Rhamnaceae, Rosaceae, Rutaceae, Scrophulariaceae, Solanaceae and Verbenaceae.

External links

Plusiini
Moths of North America
Fauna of California
Fauna of the California chaparral and woodlands
Fauna of the San Francisco Bay Area
Moths described in 1875